Jizzakh  is a city and the center of Jizzakh Region in Uzbekistan, northeast of Samarkand. Jizzakh is a district-level city. The population of Jizzakh is 179,200 (2020 est.). Uzbekistan's President Shavkat Mirziyoyev was born in the district of Zaamin in the Jizzakh region.

Etymology 
According to one version, the name of the city comes from the Sogdian word "Dizak", which means "small fortress" or "small fort".

History 
Jizzakh was an important Silk Road junction on the road connecting Samarkand with Fergana Valley. It is at the edge of Golodnaya Steppe, and next to the strategic Pass of Jilanuti (Timur's Gate) in the Turkestan Mountains, controlling the approach to the Zeravshan Valley, Samarkand and Bukhara.

The name Jizzakh derives from the Sogdian word for "small fort" and the present city is built of the site of the town which belonged to Osrushana. After the Arab conquest of Sogdiana, Jizzakh served as a market town between the nomadic raiders and settled farmers. The Arabs built a series of rabats (blockhouses) at Jizzakh, housing ghazis to protect the people. By the 19th century, these blockhouses had evolved into a major fortress for the Emirate of Bukhara. Russian General Mikhail Chernyayev, the “Lion of Tashkent” failed in his first attempt to take Jizzakh, but succeed in his second try, with a loss of 6 men, against 6000 dead for the defenders. The old town was mostly destroyed, its remaining inhabitants evicted, and Russian settlers brought in.

In 1916, Jizzakh was the center of an anti-Russian uprising, which was quickly suppressed. In 1917, Jizzakh's most famous native son, Sharof Rashidov, future secretary of the Communist Party of Uzbekistan, was born.

Modern Jizzakh is quietly tree-lined European, with almost nothing remaining of the pre-Rashidov era. The city has two universities, with a total of approximately 7,000 students, and is home to a football team, Sogdiana Jizzakh, which plays in the Uzbek League (Super Liga).

Geography 
Jizzakh is an ancient oasis. The Turkestan and Nurata ridges, which surround the southern and part of the western part of the country, and the Arnasay-Aydar-Tuzkan lakes in the northern part of the country, provides a temperate climate. The peaks are covered with snow and glaciers, Chovkar mountain, in the foothills of the Usturshona system there are thick pine forests.

From the slopes of the mountains at an altitude of 1800 meters above sea level, pine forests begin. As the mountains rise, the pine forest thickens.

There are more than 20 caves in the region. Although they have not been studied by experts, only amateurs who have observed the Peshawar cave recall that inside the cave there is a large and long square (hall), a red hearth, paintings on stone walls and petroglyphic inscriptions abound. In addition, the long cave is artificially fenced and additional stairs are made for the next hall, which testifies to the fact that primitive people lived here in ancient times.

The huge cave south of Mount Molguzar was once used as a Buddhist temple. The book "History of the Sui Dynasty" also mentions the Eastern TSao (Usturshona), "There is the city of Yecha. It is a closed cave in the city and is sacrificed twice a year. Or the cultural Tavakbulak, located on the shoulders of Mount Molguzar at an altitude of two thousand six hundred meters above sea level, can be called a miracle. On the river Aktash in Bakhmal district there is a huge cemetery on the shoulders of steep mountains, next to it there is a magnificent gorge "Blood Drop".

Or the spring that rises from the Suffa Square at the top of the mountain in Zaamin district, the nearby Muzbulak, the garden built on the top of a high mountain in Bakhmal - all this speaks of ancient history. Rivers attached to the mountains, springs flowing from glaciers, groves covering the ravines. About 100 medicinal herbs… On the banks of the Poyimard river in Jizzakh district, in the middle of a 20-meter-high rocky outcrop, all of them are natural monuments, all of which testify to the existence of primitive man.

Climate 
The climate is sharply continental. January lows average -4 ° C and July highs average 34.9 ° C. The climate at the foot of the mountains is milder than that of deserts and steppes. Annual precipitation is 400-500 mm in the south and 250-300 mm in the north. Vegetation period is 210-240 days. Annual sunny days are 2800-3000 hours. The largest rivers are Sangzor and Zaamin. There are many rivers flowing from the mountains.

Main tourist sights
 Sharof Rashidov Memorial Museum
 Provincial Museum

Notable people
 Patokh Chodiev
 Hamid Olimjon
 Sharof Rashidov
 Sardor Rashidov

Education

Schools 

 There are 29 public schools, numbered from 1 to 29
 Jizzakh Specialized School of Arts
 Jizzakh Specialized Olympic Reserve Boarding School
 KOBMMI
 IBMI
 Boarding school for gifted children named after "Umid"
 A special boarding school for the blind and visually impaired children.
 Special boarding school for children with speech impediment No. 32.

Lyceums 

 Academic lyceum under Jizzakh Polytechnic Institute
 Academic lyceum "Sayiljoy" under the Jizzakh State Pedagogical Institute
 Academic lyceum No. 2 under Jizzakh State Pedagogical Institute

Colleges 

 Jizzakh Light Industry Vocational College
 Jizzakh Medical College
 Jizzax College of Pedagogy
 Jizzakh Vocational College of Architecture and Construction
 Jizzakh Regional Law College
 Jizzakh City Vocational College of Economics and Service

Universities 

 Jizzakh State Pedagogical University
 Jizzakh Polytechnic Institute
 Uzbekistan National University Jizzakh Branch

References 

 JZ.UZ - Information portal of Jizzakh region

Populated places in Jizzakh Region
Cities in Uzbekistan
Samarkand Oblast